In 1871, Ratu Seru Epenisa Cakobau, the Vunivalu (Warlord/Paramount Chief) of Bau, succeeded in unifying the previously warring tribes throughout the Fiji Islands by establishing the Kingdom of Viti, with the support of foreigners. Cakobau proceeded to set up a constitutional monarchy, in which both the legislature and the executive were dominated by foreigners.

List of premiers of Viti (1871–1874)
Following is a list of people who have served as premier of Viti.

All existing government institutions were dissolved when Fiji became a British crown colony on 10 October 1874.

See also
 Prime Minister of Fiji

References

Kingdom of Viti, List of Premiers of

Premier of the Kingdom of Viti
1871 establishments in Fiji
1874 disestablishments in Fiji